"The Fix-Up" is the 33rd episode of the sitcom Seinfeld. It is the 16th episode of the show's third season. It aired on February 5, 1992. The episode won the award for Outstanding Writing for a Comedy Series at the 1992 Emmy Awards for Larry Charles and Elaine Pope, the writers of the episode.

Plot
At dinner, George reveals to Jerry that he has essentially given up dating and is completely desperate for a date. Later, Jerry discovers Elaine also has a friend, Cynthia (Maggie Jakobson), who is desperate to find a date. Jerry and Elaine agree to fix George and Cynthia up, vowing to be completely open about any information they receive from the two. George and Cynthia hit it off and have sex in George's kitchen, which Cynthia finds painful and uncomfortable and leads to her not returning his phone calls. Cynthia tells Elaine and George tells Jerry about their date, but George and Cynthia make Jerry and Elaine swear that they will not tell the other about the date.

A few days later, Cynthia tells Elaine she has missed her period. At the same time, Kramer, who had given George a condom made by a factory that employed his friend Bob Sacamano, informs George that the condoms are defective. During a fight between Jerry and Elaine about both not honoring their vow to be open with information about George and Cynthia, George overhears Elaine blurt out that Cynthia has missed her period. George is overjoyed to find out that he is able to get a woman pregnant, and runs to Cynthia to promise to help with the kid in any way he can and will support any decision she makes. She tells him she already got her period but is won over by his actions and they make up.

George, Elaine, Jerry and Cynthia sit down for dinner at a restaurant, but Cynthia becomes disgusted by George's poor table manners.

References

External links 
 

Seinfeld (season 3) episodes
1992 American television episodes
Emmy Award-winning episodes